Spain competed at the 1952 Summer Olympics in Helsinki, Finland. 27 competitors, all men, took part in 21 events in 7 sports.

Medalists

Silver
Ángel Léon — Shooting, Men's Free Pistol

Equestrian

Gymnastics

Rowing

Spain had six male rowers participate in two out of seven rowing events in 1952.

 Men's single sculls
 Juan Omedes

 Men's coxed four
 Salvador Costa
 Miguel Palau
 Francisco Gironella
 Pedro Massana
 Luis Omedes (cox)

Sailing

Shooting

Four shooteres represented Spain in 1952.
Men

Swimming

Water polo

References

External links
Spanish Olympic Committee
Official Olympic Reports
International Olympic Committee results database

Nations at the 1952 Summer Olympics
1952
Oly